The Veritas Forum is a non-profit organization which works with Christian students on college campuses to host forums centered on the exploration of truth and its relevancy in human life, through the questions of philosophy, religion, science, and other disciplines. The organization, named after the Latin word for truth, aims to "create university events engaging students and faculty in exploring life's hardest questions and the relevance of Jesus Christ to all of life." The first Veritas Forum was held at Harvard University in 1992. By 2008, 300,000 students had attended over 300 forums at 100 campuses across the US, Canada, France, England, and the Netherlands. In the 2010–2011 academic year, Veritas Forums were held at over 50 institutions of higher education. Veritas Forums are available for viewing online, and the organization has published several books with InterVarsity Press.

Forums
To plan a Forum, Veritas partners with Christian student groups, who organize and host the Forum, typically co-sponsored by other student organizations and academic departments. Typical events include evening keynote addresses, workshops, debates, and discussions. Common topics include the existence of God; the relationship between science and religion; social justice work; questions of social ethics; feminism and women's issues; questions of meaning or purpose in human life, evil, or beauty; human sexuality and relationships; the existence of objective truth; religion and art; Christianity and popular culture; and the historical validity of the Bible.

Kelly Monroe Kullberg founded the organization, The Veritas Forum, but has not had any affiliation with it since 2016.

The Veritas Forum has hosted several discussion events with prominent speakers representing secular or non-Christian points of view, including Peter Singer, Steven Pinker, Antony Flew, Christopher Hitchens, Shelly Kagan, Alan Lightman, and Jeffrey Sachs.

Recent discussion events include the following: the 2009 Veritas Forum at MIT with atheist philosopher Peter Singer, Christian philosophical theologian John E. Hare, and philosopher and religious scholar Eric Gregory; the 2010 Veritas Forum in the Sheldonian Theatre of the University of Oxford, with atheist and journalist Christopher Hitchens alongside Catholic philosopher and ethicist John Joseph Haldane; and the 2010 Veritas Forum at UCLA with Christian mathematician and apologist John Lennox being interviewed by UCLA Law Professor Daniel Lowenstein.

History

The first forum took place at Harvard University in 1986, and was organized as an academic conference in Christian apologetics. Peter Gomes, Harvard's campus minister, participated in the forum in 1986. The Forum's name derives from Harvard's motto, Veritas, meaning Truth. Harvard's motto reflects the school's Christian heritage: although it is popularly trimmed to the one word Veritas, it officially reads "Veritas Christo et Ecclesiae," or Truth for Christ and the Church. With this name, Veritas seeks to remind the university community of the centrality of Christ to its founding. At the first Veritas Forum writers of the book Finding God at Harvard gathered to share their own questions, sufferings, journeys, and discoveries with the Harvard community. 

After its first forum at Harvard, Veritas Forums spread to the University of Michigan, Ohio State, the University of Virginia, Yale and eventually across the country to Berkeley, Stanford, UC Davis, and UCLA.

France had its first Veritas Forum in 2006; England and the Netherlands in 2007; Macedonia in 2010. In the academic year 2010-2011, Forums were held at over forty American institutions of higher education. To date, over 400 speakers have presented at a Veritas event, representing a variety of disciplines and worldviews.

Past speakers

Christian speakers

 Denis Alexander - Director of the Faraday Institute for Science and Religion at St Edmund's College, Cambridge
 Justin L. Barrett - psychologist and member of the Thrive Center for Human Development 
 Jeremy Begbie - scholar of Christianity and the arts at Duke Divinity School
 Craig Blomberg - American New Testament scholar at Denver Seminary
 Mia Chung -  pianist,  and professor of Interpretive Analysis at Curtis Institute of Music
 Francis Collins - American physicist-geneticist, former head of the Human Genome Project
 Caroline Cox - member of the British House of Lords and CEO of the Humanitarian Aid Relief Trust
 William Lane Craig - American apologist, theologian, analytic philosopher and professor at Talbot School of Theology
 Marla Frederick - professor of African-American Studies and the Study of Religion at Harvard University
 Robert P. George - professor of jurisprudence at Princeton University
 Owen Gingerich - professor of astronomy and the history of science at Harvard University
 Os Guinness - noted author and apologist
 Gary Habermas - American philosopher of religion
 William Hurlbut - physician and consulting professor in the Neuroscience Institute at Stanford University
 Ian Hutchinson - nuclear physicist at the Massachusetts Institute of Technology
 Timothy Keller - Christian pastor in New York City and author of Reason for God
 Peter Kreeft - professor of philosophy at Boston College
 Madeleine L'Engle - American author of  A Wrinkle in Time
 Michael Licona - American apologist, historian and New Testament scholar
 John Lennox - Irish apologist, mathematician and philosopher of science 
 Ard Louis - reader of theoretical physics at Oxford University
 Paul L. Maier - American historian and writer
 George Marsden - historian and professor at the University of Notre Dame
 Frederica Mathewes-Green - Eastern Orthodox author and speaker on religion
 Alister McGrath - Anglican priest, theologian, professor at King's College London
 Kenneth R. Miller - American professor of biology and author of "Finding Darwin's God"
 J.P. Moreland - American philosopher, theologian, and apologist
 Richard John Neuhaus - prominent Christian cleric, founder and editor of "First Things" 
 Rosalind Picard - professor of media arts and sciences at MIT, director of the Affective Computing Research Group at the MIT Media Lab
 Alvin Plantinga - American analytic philosopher and former professor at the University of Notre Dame
 John Polkinghorne - English theoretical physicist, Anglican priest, and professor at Cambridge University
 Mary Poplin - professor of education at Claremont Graduate University
 Vinoth Ramachandra - Sri Lankan Christian theologian and Secretary for Dialogue and Social Engagement for the International Fellowship of Evangelical Students
 Hugh Ross - Canadian astrophysicist and Christian apologist
 Fritz Schaefer - computational and theoretical chemist, professor at the University of Georgia
 John Stott - English Christian leader and Anglican cleric, principal author of the Lausanne Covenant
 S. Joshua Swamidass -American scientist in computational biology, professor at Washington University in St. Louis
 Peter Thiel - American investor and venture capitalist
 Troy Van Voorhis - MIT chemistry professor
 Miroslav Volf - Croatian professor of Christian theology at Yale University
 John H. Walton, theologian and Old Testament scholar at Wheaton College
 Dallas Willard - American philosopher, formerly a professor at the University of Southern California
 Peter J. Williams - British Bible scholar and lecturer
 Lauren Winner - author and lecturer, professor at Duke Divinity School
 Jennifer Wiseman - American astronomer at NASA Goddard Space Flight Center
 Nicholas Wolterstorff - philosopher at Yale University
 N.T. Wright - noted scholar and professor at the University of St. Andrews

Non-Christian speakers 

 Colin Adams - mathematician, author, and professor at Williams College
 Dan Barker -  American atheist and former Christian preacher
 Akeel Bilgrami - Indian-born philosopher of language and mind
 Sean M. Carroll - American physicist and theoretical cosmologist
 Veena Das - professor of anthropology at Johns Hopkins University
 David Eisenbach - historian and professor at Columbia University
 Antony Flew - British philosopher of religion and former atheist
 Marcelo Gleiser - Brazilian physicist at Dartmouth College, astronomer, and author of A Tear at the Edge of Creation
 Garrett Hardin -  American ecologist, coiner of the phrase "tragedy of the commons,"  professor at University of California at Santa Barbara
 David Helfand - chair of the Astronomy department at Columbia University
 Christopher Hitchens - British author, journalist, and advocate of atheism
 Donald Hubin - professor of philosophy at Ohio State University 
 Shelly Kagan - professor of philosophy at Yale University
 Nicholas D. Kristof - American journalist and winner of two Pulitzer prizes
 Alan Lightman - MIT professor and author of  Einstein's Dreams
 Gerd Lüdemann - German critical New Testament scholar and atheist
 Steven Pinker - Harvard University professor of psychology and  atheist
 Jeffrey Sachs - American economist ,  Director of the Earth Institute at Columbia University
 Scott Sehon - professor of philosophy at Bowdoin College
 Peter Singer - Australian philosopher, professor of bioethics at Princeton University, and hedonistic utilitarian

Books and media
Veritas Forum recordings are freely available on the Veritas website.

Veritas Forum Books seek to provide "academically engaging, culturally relevant and distinctively Christian points of view" to the public. Current titles include the following:

A Place for Truth edited by Dallas Willard, published in the fall of 2010
The Dawkins Delusion by Alister McGrath and Joanna Collicutt McGrath
Finding Calcutta by Mary Poplin
Did the Resurrection Happen? featuring a discussion between Gary Habermas and Antony Flew

Notes and references

External links
 Veritas.org: Official website
 Veritas Europe
 Official Veritas Forum YouTube channel
 Official Veritas Forum Flickr photostream
 Veritas Riff in Wall Street Journal

Local media
 UCLA
 University of New Hampshire

International non-profit organizations
Student religious organizations in the United States
Christianity and science
Non-profit organizations based in Massachusetts